The following lists events that happened during 2015 in Slovakia.

Incumbents

Head of State 
2015 is the first full year of the 4th President Andrej Kiska, elected as an independent candidate in the 2014.

 President – Andrej Kiska (Independent)

Government 
2015 is the last full year of the 8th National Council. Next parliamentary elections will be held on or before 5 March 2016. The Robert Fico's Second Cabinet, elected in 2012 consisted solely from Direction – Social Democracy party (abbreviated Smer-SD), continues.

 Speaker of the National Council – Peter Pellegrini (Smer-SD)
 Prime Minister – Robert Fico (Smer-SD)
 Minister of Foreign Affairs – Miroslav Lanjčák (Independent)
 Minister of Interior – Robert Kaliňák (Smer-SD)
 Minister of Finance – Peter Kažimír (Smer-SD)
 Minister of Defence – Martin Glváč (Smer-SD)

Major parties' leaders 
Parties in National Council
 Direction – Social Democracy (abbreviated Smer-SD) – Robert Fico
 Christian Democratic Movement (abbreviated KDH) – Ján Figeľ
 Ordinary People and Independent Personalities (abbreviated OĽaNO) – Igor Matovič
 Most–Híd – Béla Bugár
 Slovak Democratic and Christian Union – Democratic Party (abbreviated SDKÚ-DS) – Pavol Frešo
 Freedom and Solidarity (abbreviated SaS) – Richard Sulík

Major extra-parliamentary parties
 Network – Radoslav Procházka
 Slovak Civic Coalition (abbreviated SKOK!) – Juraj Miškov
 Slovak National Party (abbreviated SNS) – Andrej Danko
 Party of the Hungarian Community (Slovak & Hungarian: , abbreviated SMK-MKP) – József Berényi

Other state leading representatives 
 Head of the Constitutional Court of Slovakia – Ivetta Macejková

Chairpersons of Self-governing Regions 
 Bratislava Self-governing Region – Pavol Frešo (coalition of SDKÚ-DS, KDH, Most–Híd, SMK-MKP, OKS, SaS, SZ)
 Trnava Self-governing Region – Tibor Mikuš (Independent)
 Trenčín Self-governing Region – Jaroslav Baška (Smer-SD)
 Nitra Self-governing Region – Milan Belica (coalition of Smer-SD, SNS, ASV)
 Banská Bystrica Self-governing Region – Marian Kotleba (ĽSNS)
 Žilina Self-governing Region – Juraj Blanár (coalition of HZD, SNS, Smer-SD)
 Košice Self-governing Region – Zdenko Trebuľa (Smer-SD)
 Prešov Self-governing Region – Peter Chudík (coalition of Smer-SD, HZD, SNS)

Events

January 
 January 1 – President Andrej Kiska in his New Year's speech stressed need to fight corruption, need for political activism, reducing bureaucracy. Kiska also described situation in Ukraine as a breach of Ukrainian territorial sovereignty and interference with the political independence of the country.
 January 27 – 46th Session of the National Council (to February 13)

February 
 February 1 – Regulation No. 1 of 2015 of the Slovak Republic Ministry of Interior on granting state citizenship of the Slovak Republic for specific reasons came into force. The regulation allows granting the citizenship to former Slovakia's citizens who lost citizenship after January 1, 1993, including those, who lost citizenship due to acquisition of foreign country's citizenship, under the Act No. 250/2010 Coll. of laws Amending and Supplementing the Act No. 40/1993 on State Citizenship
 February 7 – 2015 Slovak same-sex marriage referendum failed with only 21.4% of citizens casting a vote
 February 18 – 47th Session of the National Council

Deaths

January 
 1 January – Drahoslav Machala, writer and journalist (b. 1947)
 2 January – Arpád Račko, sculptor (b. 1930)

February 
 1 February – Martin Ťapák, film director, actor, dancer and choreographer (b. 1926)
 15 February – Michal Benčík, lawyer, politician of former Communist Party of Czechoslovakia and later Party of the Democratic Left, member of Czechoslovak Federal Assembly and Slovak National Council (b. 1932)

March 
 15 March – Ján Kulich, sculptor (b. 1930)
 15 March – Marián Mikluš, army major-general and Chief of the General Staff in 1998 (b. 1953)
 22 March – Peter Pišťanek, writer (b. 1960)
 26 March – Kornel Földvári, poet, journalist, art and literature critic and translator (b. 1932)
 27 March – Martin Porubjak, college professor, dramaturge, playwright, theater and film scriptwriter and director (b. 1944)
 29 March – Ivan Niňaj, sports commentator (b. 1954)

April 
 11 April – Braňo Hochel, writer, university associate professor, literary scholar, translator and politician of Democratic Party (b. 1951)
 26 April – Pavol Sedláček, medical doctor, politician of former People's Party – Movement for a Democratic Slovakia and Chairman of Trenčín Self-governing Region in 2006–2013 (b. 1949)

 
2010s in Slovakia
Slovakia
Slovakia
Years of the 21st century in Slovakia